The 8th Independent Battery Wisconsin Light Artillery, nicknamed the "Lyons' Pinery Battery," was an artillery battery that served in the Union Army during the American Civil War.

Service
The 8th Independent Battery was mustered into service at Racine, Wisconsin, on January 8, 1862.

The battery was mustered out on August 10, 1865.

Total strength and casualties
The 8th Independent Battery initially recruited 161 officers and men.  An additional 102 men were recruited as replacements, for a total of 263
men.

The battery suffered 1 officer and 1 enlisted man killed in action or died of wounds and 26 enlisted men who died of disease, for a total of 28 fatalities.

Commanders
 Captain Stephen J. Carpenter
 Captain Henry E. Stiles

See also

 List of Wisconsin Civil War units
 Wisconsin in the American Civil War

Notes

References
The Civil War Archive

Military units and formations established in 1862
Military units and formations disestablished in 1865
Units and formations of the Union Army from Wisconsin
Wisconsin
1862 establishments in Wisconsin